Sichuan–Shanghai gas pipeline is a  long natural gas pipeline in China. The pipeline runs from Pugang gas field in Dazhou, Sichuan Province, to Qingpu District of Shanghai. Two shorter branches are located near the Puguang gas field and one in the east near Shanghai.

The tunnel to cross Yangtze River was completed in October 2007. The tunnel is about  beneath the riverbed and connects two wells on each side of the river.

The capacity of the pipeline is 12 billion cubic meters (bcm) of natural gas per year.  It has eight centrifugal compressors, provided by GE Oil & Gas.  The operator of the pipeline is Sinopec. Sinopec sold 50℅ stake of the operator to China Life Insurance Company and State Development & Investment Corporation.

See also

 West–East Gas Pipeline
 Shaan–Jing pipeline
 Zhongxian–Wuhan Pipeline

References

Energy infrastructure completed in 2010
Natural gas pipelines in China